Mian Muhammad Saqib Khurshid is a Pakistani politician who was a Member of the Provincial Assembly of the Punjab, from 1993 to 1999 and again from May 2013 and May 2018 and from August 2018 to January 2023.

Early life and education
He was born on 26 October 1962.

He has the degree of Master of Arts in History and Pakistan Studies which he obtained in 1986 from the Islamia University. He received a Diploma in Islamic Studies from International Islamic University, Islamabad in 1987.

Political career
He was elected to the Provincial Assembly of the Punjab as a candidate of Pakistan Muslim League (N) (PML-N) from Constituency PP-195 (Vehari-IV) in 1993 Pakistani general election. He received 31,413 votes and defeated Nazar Muhammad Duggal, a candidate of Pakistan Islamic Front.

He was re-elected to the Provincial Assembly of the Punjab as a candidate of PML-N from Constituency PP-195 (Vehari-IV) in 1997 Pakistani general election. received 27,958 votes and defeated Rana Tahir Mahmood, an independent candidate.
PML N came into being 8n early 2000s so how could He join and won by such party in 90s.

He was elected to the Provincial Assembly of the Punjab as a candidate of PML-N from Constituency PP-236 (Vehari-V) in 2013 Pakistani general election. He received 44,694 votes and defeated an independent candidate, Rana Tahir Mahmood Khan.

He was re-elected to Provincial Assembly of the Punjab as a candidate of PML-N from Constituency PP-234 (Vehari-VI) in 2018 Pakistani general election.

References

Living people
Punjab MPAs 2013–2018
1962 births
Pakistan Muslim League (N) MPAs (Punjab)
Punjab MPAs 1993–1996
Punjab MPAs 1997–1999
Punjab MPAs 2018–2023